The ancestral background of presidents of the United States has been relatively consistent throughout American history. With the exception of Martin Van Buren and perhaps Dwight D. Eisenhower, every president has ancestors from the British Isles, which in turn makes many of them distantly related to one another. Kennedy was of pure Irish descent, Van Buren was of Dutch lineage; and Eisenhower was of German and Swiss heritage. Barack Obama is the only president to have recent ancestry from outside Western Europe; his paternal family is of the Luo people of East Africa. He is also believed to be a direct descendant of John Punch, a colonial-era slave born in modern-day Cameroon. Despite speculation, there is no evidence that any of the United States of America’s presidents have had any Indigenous American ancestry.

The most common ethnic groups in the Thirteen Colonies were those hailing from either Great Britain or Northern Ireland. Those of other backgrounds (such as Irish, Dutch, German, or French) would see attempts to assimilate them into the dominant English and predominately Protestant culture.

Some nativist political groups within the United States were adamantly opposed to identifying with a foreign nation and would coin those who did as hyphenated Americans. Presidents Theodore Roosevelt and Woodrow Wilson were outspoken opponents of hyphenated Americans, with Wilson once remarking, "Any man who carries a hyphen about with him, carries a dagger that he is ready to plunge into the vitals of this Republic when he gets ready."

Ancestry table 
Summary: Dutch5 English39 French12 German11 Irish5 Kenyan (Luo)1 Scottish19 Swiss3 Ulster Scots21 Welsh15

See also 
 African-American heritage of presidents of the United States
 Most royal candidate theory
 Lists of Americans (lists of people from the United States by various criteria, including ethnic or national origin)

References

Further reading

External links 
 Presidential Family Trees and Famous Kin, famouskin.com

Presidents
Lists relating to the United States presidency
Presidents